Pop Mašina (trans. Pop Machine) was a Yugoslav progressive rock band formed in Belgrade in 1972. Pop Mašina was one of the most notable bands of the Yugoslav rock scene in the 1970s.

Pop Mašina was formed by bass guitarist and vocalist Robert Nemeček, guitarist and vocalist Zoran Božinović, drummer Ratislav "Raša" Đelmaš and vocalist Sava Bojić. Đelmaš and Bojić left Pop Mašina soon after its formation, and the band continued as a trio with the new drummer, Mihajlo "Bata" Popović. The lineup featuring Nemeček, Zoran Božinović and Popović is the longest lasting, the most successful and the best known Pop Mašina lineup. Pop Mašina was one of the first bands on the Yugoslav rock scene to move towards heavier rock sound, managing to gain large popularity as a live act with their hard rock sound with blues, psychedelic and acid rock elements. The band released two studio albums and a live album – their debut Kiselina (Acid) today considered one of the most important records in the history of Yugoslav rock – before Nemeček left the band in 1976 for his mandatory army stint. Zoran Božinović continued to lead Pop Mašina, the new lineup featuring his brother Vidoja "Džindžer" Božinović on guitar. New lineups of Pop Mašina had little success, and the band officially disbanded in 1978. In 1980 Nemeček and the Božinović brothers formed the short-lasting hard rock and heavy metal band Rok Mašina (Rock Machine).

Band history

1972–1978
The band was formed in Belgrade in 1972 by Robert Nemeček (a former member of the bands Dogovor iz 1804., Džentlmeni, and Intro, bass guitar and vocals), Zoran Božinović (a former member of Excellent, Rokeri, Džentlmeni, and Intro, guitar and vocals), Ratislav "Raša" Đelmaš (drums) and Sava Bojić (vocals). Very soon, Bojić left the band (in 1974 he would join the progressive rock band Tako), and soon after Đelmaš also left, joining YU Grupa. Đelmaš was replaced by a former Intro and Siluete member Mihajlo "Bata" Popović, Pop Mašina continuing as a power trio.

Pop Mašina was one of the first bands on the Yugoslav rock scene to move towards heavier rock sound. They often held free concerts, and in 1972 they organized a free open-air concert at Hajdučka česma in Belgrade which featured, alongside Pop Mašina, performances by S Vremena Na Vreme, Porodična Manufaktura Crnog Hleba and other bands. The following year, on 25 May, which was celebrated as Youth Day in Yugoslavia, Pop Mašina organized another free concert at Hajdučka česma, which featured the bands Jutro, Grupa 220, Vlada i Bajka and others. 

In 1973 Pop Mašina released their debut album, Kiselina (Acid), through PGP-RTB record label. The album featured hard rock sound with psychedelic and acid rock elements, but also featured acoustic sections in the tracks like "Mir" ("Peace") and "Povratak zvezdama" ("Return to the Stars"). The album's main theme was a psychedelic experience; originally, the opening track should have been "Tražim put" ("I'm Searching for a Road"), allegorically describing narrator's attempts to find a drug dealer. In a 2011 interview Nemeček stated that he wrote the original lyrics for the album after some notes he made while being under the influence of LSD. However, the band realized the censors in the state-owned PGP-RTB might refuse to approve the release of the album and decided to cover up the album concept. They made numerous changes to the songs and altered the original track listing. The original album cover, designed by cartoonist and graphic designer Jugoslav Vlahović, who was aware of the album concept, featured psychedelic artwork inspired by the psychedelic portraits of The Beatles. However, realizing that the artwork might reveal the album's theme to PGP-RTB censors and editors, band members and Vlahović decided to put a simple photograph of the band on the cover. The photograph was made only several days before printing of the cover and the album release. Kiselina featured numerous guest musicians: Pop Mašina former member Raša Đelmaš on drums, a former Porodična Manufaktura Crnog Hleba member Branimir Malkoč on flute, Sloba Marković on keyboards, SOS member Miša Aleksić on bass guitar, and singer-songwriter Drago Mlinarec, S Vremena Na Vreme members Ljuba Ninković and Vojislav Đukić and the members of the trio DAG on backing vocals. Pop Mašina and S Vremena Na Vreme continued to cooperate in studio and on live appearances, and in 1975 Nemeček would appear as a guest on S Vremena Na Vreme self-titled debut album. Despite the band's efforts to cover up the album theme, after its release a journalist for the Ilustrovana Politika magazine who spent some time in the United States revealed the true meaning of the album title to the PGP-RTB editors.

After the release of Kiselina, the band held a large number of concerts across Yugoslavia. They had numerous performances in Belgrade Sports Hall. These concerts were organized with the help of Aleksandar Tijanić, at the time a journalism student, and other Yugoslav progressive rock bands were often invited to perform. Pop Mašina had an attractive on-stage appearance: Božinović was one of the first former Yugoslav guitarists that played long guitar solos and used to play guitar with a bow and behind his back. On one of these concerts Nemeček smashed his bass guitar and threw it into the audience; it was caught by young musician Miroslav Cvetković, who fixed it and started playing it. Cvetković would later himself become a member of Pop Mašina.

At the beginning of 1975, in Akademik Studio in Ljubljana, the band recorded their second studio album, Na izvoru svetlosti (At the Spring of Light). The album was produced by Ivo Umek and Nemeček. It featured Ljuba Ninković and Sloba Marković as guest musicians. The album featured one live track, the blues song "Negde daleko" ("Somewhere Far Away"), recorded on the band's concert held in Belgrade Sports Hall on 2 January 1974. The song "Rekvijem za prijatelja" ("Requiem for a Friend"), with lyrics written by Ljuba Ninković, was dedicated to Predrag Jovičić, the vocalist of the band San, who earlier that year died from an electric shock on a concert in Čair Sports Center in Niš. The album also featured a new version of the song "Zemlja svetlosti" ("Land of Light"), previously released on a 7-inch single. After the album release, the band was joined by the keyboardist Oliver Mandić. However, he left the band after only several performances, later gaining fame as a solo artist. In 1976, the band released the live album Put ka Suncu (Road to Sun), recorded on three different performances in Belgrade Sports Hall, thus becoming the first Yugoslav band to release a solo live album (as prior to Put ka Suncu only various artists live albums were released).

At the end of 1976, Nemeček left the band to serve his mandatory stint in the Yugoslav army, Mihajlović leaving the band soon after. Zoran Božinović was joined by his brother, guitarist Vidoja "Džindžer" Božinović (a former Dim Bez Vatre member), bass guitarist Dušan "Duda" Petrović and drummer Dušan "Đuka" Đukić (a former Innamorata member). The new Pop Mašina lineup started experimenting with jazz rock sound, but soon turned to conventional hard rock. After Nemeček returned from the army, he did not rejoin Pop Mašina; he moved to London, where he started working in the music instruments company Toma & Co. From London he also wrote for Yugoslav magazines RTV revija (Radio and Television Revue) and YU video. The new Pop Mašina lineup recorded only one 7-inch single, with the songs "Moja pesma" ("My Song") and "Uspomena" ("Memory"). They performed, alongside Zdravo, Zlatni Prsti, Drugi Način, Parni Valjak, Time and other bands, on a concert in Belgrade's Pinki Hall, the recordings of their songs "Sećanja" ("Memories") and "Moja pesma" appearing on the various aritsts live labum Pop Parada 1 (Pop Parade 1) recorded on the concert. In 1977, Petrović left the band, joining Generacija 5, and was replaced by Miroslav "Cvele" Cvetković (a former Tilt member). This lineup announced the recording of a new album, but disbanded in 1978.

Post-breakup, Rok Mašina and post-Rok Mašina
After Pop Mašina disbanded, Vidoja Božinović and Dušan Đukić joined the band Dah. After Dah disbanded in 1979, Božinović joined the band Opus in which he spent only six months. After he returned from London, Nemeček worked in Dadov Theatre as an editor of the theatre's rock program. In 1980 Nemeček, Božinović brothers and drummer Vladan Dokić formed the hard rock and heavy metal band Rok Mašina, which released only one self-title album before disbanding in 1982. Part of the material they recorded for their second album was released in 1983 on the EP Izrod na granici (Bastard on the Border).

After Rok Mašina disbanded, Zoran Božinović retired from music. In the 1990s he returned to performing, playing with the blues rock band Zona B. He died in 2004. Vidoja Božinovič dedicated himself to his studies of architecture, performed in blues clubs and with the jazz band Interactive before joining Riblja Čorba in 1984. Nemeček became the film program editor at RTV Politika, and in the 1990s became the editor of film program on Television Pink.

In 1994, a remastered version of Kiselina was released on CD by Serbian record label ITVMM. The release featured the songs "Put ka Suncu" and "Sjaj u očima" ("Glowing Eyes"), originally released on Pop Mašina's first 7-inch single, as bonus track. During the same year, the song "Kiselina" was released on Komuna compilation album Plima: Progresivna muzika (Tide: Progressive Music) which featured songs by Yugoslav progressive rock artists. In 2000, Kiselina was reissued on CD by Polish record label Wydawnictwo 21, in a limited number of 500 copies and featuring four bonus tracks. In 2005, the album was reissued on vinyl by Austrian record label Atlantide.

In 2007, to celebrate 35 years since the release of Kiselina, Nemeček, in cooperation with Serbian label MCG records, released the CD Originalna Kiselina – 35 godina kasnije (Original Acid – 35 Years Later) in a limited number of 999 copies. The release featured original Kiselina track listing and different song mixes. In 2008, Internut Music and Multimedia Records released the box set Antologija 1972 – 1976 (Anthology 1972 – 1976), which featured all the recordings released by Pop Mašina, 9 unreleased tracks, a recording of a concert in Belgrade Sports Hall, and a book about the band.

The band's former bass guitarist Dušan Petrović died on 17 October 2003. The band's forming member Ratislav "Raša" Đelmaš died in Belgrade on 28 October 2021.

Legacy
The song "Zemlja svetlosti" was covered by Serbian and Yugoslav alternative rock band Disciplina Kičme on their 1991 album Nova iznenađenja za nova pokolenja (New Surprises for New Generations). The song "Sećanja" ("Memories") was covered by Serbian and Yugoslav singer-songwriter Nikola Čuturilo on his 2011 album Tu i sad (Here and Now), Vidoja Božinović making a guest appearance on the track. Songs "Negde daleko" and "Put na suncu" were covered in 2019 by Serbian blues rock band Texas Flood on their cover album Tražim ljude kao ja (I'm Looking for the People like Me).

The album Kiselina was polled in 1998 as 60th on the list of 100 greatest Yugoslav popular music albums in the book YU 100: najbolji albumi jugoslovenske rok i pop muzike (YU 100: The Best albums of Yugoslav pop and rock music). The song "Put ka Suncu" was polled in 2000 as 92nd on Rock Express Top 100 Yugoslav Rock Songs of All Times list.

On 5 October 2005, in Belgrade's Bard Club, a concert dedicated to Zoran Božinović was held. The musicians performing on the concert included his brother Vidoja, Miroslav Cvetković (of Bajaga i Instruktori, formerly of Pop Mašina), Nebojša Antonijević (of Partibrejkers), Dejan Cukić, Petar Radmilović (of Đorđe Balašević's backing band), Dušan Kojić (of Disciplina Kičme), Branislav Petrović (of Električni Orgazam), Dušan Đukić (formerly of Pop Mašina), Nikola Čuturilo, Manja Đorđević (of Disciplina Kičme), Vladimir Đorđević (of Lira Vega and Sila), Vlada Negovanović, the bands Van Gogh and Zona B, and others. The recording of the concert was released on the DVD Put ka Suncu – Noć posvećena Zoranu Božinoviću (Road to Sun – A Night Dedicated to Zoran Božinović).

Band members
Robert Nemeček – bass guitar, vocals (1972–1976)
Zoran Božinović – guitar, vocals (1972–1978)
Ratislav "Raša" Đelmaš – drums (1972)
Sava Bojić – guitar, vocals (1972)
Mihajlo "Bata" Popović – drums, percussion (1972–1976)
Oliver Mandić – keyboards, vocals (1975)
Dušan "Duda" Petrović – bass guitar (1976–1977)
Dušan "Đuka" Đukić – drums (1976–1978)
Vidoja "Džindžer" Božinović – guitar (1976–1978)
Miroslav "Cvele" Cvetković – bass guitar, vocals (1977–1978)

Discography

Studio albums
Kiselina (1973)
Na izvoru svetlosti (1975)

Live albums
Put ka Suncu (1976)

Box sets
Antologija 1972 – 1976 (2008)

Singles
"Put ka Suncu" / "Sjaj u očima" (1972)
"Promenićemo svet" / "Svemirska priča" (1973)
"Zemlja svetlosti" / "Dugo lutanje kroz noć" (1974)
"Sećanja" / "Rekvijem za prijatelja" (1975)
"Moja pesma" / "Uspomena" (1977)

Other appearances
"Sećanje" / "Moja pesma" (Pop Parada 1, 1977)

References

External links
Official website
Pop Mašina at Discogs
Pop Mašina at Prog Archives

See also
Rok Mašina

Serbian rock music groups
Serbian progressive rock groups
Serbian hard rock musical groups
Serbian psychedelic rock music groups
Serbian blues rock musical groups
Yugoslav rock music groups
Yugoslav progressive rock groups
Yugoslav hard rock musical groups
Yugoslav psychedelic rock music groups
Acid rock music groups
Musical groups from Belgrade
Musical trios
Musical groups established in 1972
Musical groups disestablished in 1978
1972 establishments in Yugoslavia
1978 disestablishments in Yugoslavia